Sidney K. "Sid" Meier (born February 24, 1954) is a Canadian-born Swiss-American programmer, designer, and producer of several strategy video games and simulation video games, including the Civilization series. Meier co-founded MicroProse in 1982 with Bill Stealey and is the Director of Creative Development of Firaxis Games, which he co-founded with Jeff Briggs and Brian Reynolds in 1996. For his contributions to the video game industry, Meier was inducted into the Academy of Interactive Arts and Sciences Hall of Fame.

Early life and education
Meier was born in Sarnia, Ontario, Canada, to parents of Dutch and Swiss descent, giving him both Canadian and Swiss citizenship. A few years later, the family moved to Michigan, US, where Meier was raised. He studied history and computer science, graduating with a degree in computer science from the University of Michigan in 1975.

Career
Following college, Meier worked in developing cash register systems for department stores. During this period, Meier purchased an Atari 800 c. 1981, which helped him realize that computer programming could be used to make video games. He found a co-worker, Bill Stealey, who had a similar interest in developing games, and shared the games that Meier had developed. The two decided to launch a new company for computer game development.

At MicroProse

Meier founded MicroProse with Stealey in 1982. After a few initial 2D action games, such as Meier's platformer Floyd of the Jungle, MicroProse settled into a run of flight simulation titles beginning with Hellcat Ace (1982) and continuing with Spitfire Ace (1982), Solo Flight (1983), and F-15 Strike Eagle (1985), all designed and programmed by Meier.

By 1986 MicroProse was using Meier's name and face in advertisements for its games. In 1987, the company released Sid Meier's Pirates!, the first with Meier's name in the title. He later explained that the inclusion of his name was because Pirates! is very different from the company's earlier titles. Stealey decided that Meier's name would make those who purchased the flight simulators more likely to play the game. Stealey recalled: "We were at dinner at a Software Publishers Association meeting, and Robin Williams was there. And he kept us in stitches for two hours. And he turns to me and says 'Bill, you should put Sid's name on a couple of these boxes, and promote him as the star.' And that's how Sid's name got on Pirates, and Civilization."

The idea was successful; by 1992 an entry in Computer Gaming World poetry contest praised Meier's name as "a guarantee they got it right". Meier is not always the main designer on titles that carry his name. For instance, Brian Reynolds has been credited as the primary designer behind Sid Meier's Civilization II, Sid Meier's Alpha Centauri, and Sid Meier's Colonization, while Jeff Briggs designed Sid Meier's Civilization III, Soren Johnson led Sid Meier's Civilization IV, Jon Shafer led Sid Meier's Civilization V, and Will Miller and David McDonough were the designers of Sid Meier's Civilization: Beyond Earth.

After the release of F-19 Stealth Fighter, Meier focused on strategy games, later saying "Everything I thought was cool about a flight simulator had gone into that game." Inspired by SimCity and Empire, he created Sid Meier's Railroad Tycoon and later the game series for which he is most widely recognized, Sid Meier's Civilization, although he designed only the first installment.

Around 1990, Stealey wanted to expand MicroProse to produce arcade games, which Meier felt was too risky. Unable to resolve the matter with Stealey, Meier quietly sold Stealey his half of the company but otherwise remained with the company in his same role.

At Firaxis Games
MicroProse, after it had become a public company, merged with Spectrum HoloByte in 1993 under Spectrum's name, with Spectrum as the operating company. As a cost-cutting measure, Spectrum cut many of the jobs at MicroProse at 1996 and consolidated much of their operations. Meier, along with MicroProse employees Jeff Briggs and Brian Reynolds, were dissastified with these decisions, and opted to leave the company to form Firaxis Games in 1997.

Firaxis continued to develop the same type of strategy games that Meier had developed at MicroProse, many of which are follow-ups to those titles, such as the new Civilization games and a remake of Sid Meier's Pirates! (2004). In 1996, he invented a "System for Real-Time Music Composition and Synthesis" used in C.P.U. Bach. Next Generation listed him in their "75 Most Important People in the Games Industry of 1995", calling him "a prolific developer of some of the best games in [MicroProse]'s catalog".

According to Firaxis employees, Meier has been constantly developing a special game engine since around 1996 which he uses to prototype his game ideas and which he has not shared with anyone else. Dennis Shirk, a senior producer, said in 2016 that Meier would sometimes arrive at the office and announce he had a new game prototype for the company to try out and see if it could be developed further. The engine is believed by Firaxis employees to be based on his original Civilization source, but expanded over the years with updates that he or other engineers will write for him.

Meier worked with a team on a dinosaur-themed game starting in early 2000, but announced in an online development diary in 2001 that the game had been shelved. Despite trying various approaches, including turn-based and real-time gameplay, he said he found no way to make the concept fun enough. In 2005, he said, "We've been nonstop busy making other games over the past several years, so the dinosaur game remains on the shelf. However, I do love the idea of a dinosaur game and would like to revisit it when I have some time."

An autobiography, Sid Meier's Memoir!: A Life in Computer Games, was published on September 8, 2020, by W. W. Norton & Company.

Development style
Computer Gaming World reported in 1994 that "Sid Meier has stated on numerous occasions that he emphasizes the 'fun parts' of a simulation and throws out the rest". "Meier insisted", the magazine reported that year, "that discovering the elusive quality of fun is the toughest part of design". According to PC Gamer, "Though his games are frequently about violent times and places, there is never any blood or gore shown. He designs and creates his games by playing them, over and over, until they are fun".

Personal life
Meier lives in Hunt Valley, Maryland, with his second wife Susan, whom he met at Faith Evangelical Lutheran Church in Cockeysville, where he is the Director of Contemporary Music. The couple lead contemporary music worship. Meier has a son, Ryan Meier, who works for Blizzard Entertainment.

Awards

In 1996, GameSpot put Meier at the top of their listing of the "Most Influential People in Computer Gaming of All Time", calling him "our Hitchcock, our Spielberg, our Ellington".
That same year, Computer Gaming World ranked him as eighth on the list of the "Most Influential Industry Players of All Time", noting that no game designer has had as many CGW Hall of Fame games as Sid Meier.
In 1997, Computer Gaming World ranked him as number one on the list of the "Most Influential People of All Time in Computer Gaming", for game design.
In 1999, he became the second person to be inducted into the Academy of Interactive Arts and Sciences' Hall of Fame.
In 2008, he received a Lifetime Achievement Award at the 2008 Game Developer's Conference.
In 2009, he came fifth in a Develop survey that asked some 9,000 game makers about their "ultimate development hero".
In 2009, he was ranked second in IGN's list of "Top Game Creators of All Time", and was called "the ideal role model for any aspiring game designer".
In 2017, he was awarded the Life Achievement by the Golden Joystick Awards.

Games
The games developed, co-developed and/or produced by Sid Meier:

References

External links

 Sid Meier's biography and games history at Firaxis.com
 
 
 Official site for "Sid Meier's Memoir!"

1954 births
Academy of Interactive Arts & Sciences Hall of Fame inductees
American Lutherans
American people of Dutch descent
American people of Swiss-German descent
American video game designers
American video game programmers
Game Developers Conference Lifetime Achievement Award recipients
Living people
MicroProse people
People from Baltimore County, Maryland
People from Sarnia
University of Michigan alumni
Video game producers